General I. Zaragoza ( or Terminal Zaragoza) is a station on Lines 2 and 3 of the Monterrey Metro. It is located in Monterrey, on the heart of the Macroplaza. The station was opened on 30 November 1994 as the eastern terminus of the inaugural section of Line 2, between General Anaya and Zaragoza.

This station serves the heart of the Monterrey shopping district. It is one block away from Morelos Street, and Monterrey's Zona Rosa, MARCO museum and the Monterrey City Hall.  It is accessible for people with disabilities.

It is named after General Ignacio Zaragoza and the nearby Avenida Ignacio Zaragoza.  The station logo depicts this Mexican military genius – the hero of the Battle of Puebla – astride his horse.

See also
List of Monterrey metro stations

References

Metrorrey stations
Railway stations opened in 1994
Railway stations located underground in Mexico